Little Women is a 1933 American pre-Code drama film directed by George Cukor and starring Katharine Hepburn, Joan Bennett, Frances Dee and Jean Parker. The screenplay, written by Sarah Y. Mason and Victor Heerman, is based on the 1868-69 two-volume novel of the same name by Louisa May Alcott.

This is the third screen adaptation of the book. It follows two silent versions, the first released in 1917 with Minna Grey and the second in 1918 with Dorothy Bernard. After this 1933 sound version came the 1949 Little Women, with June Allyson, Elizabeth Taylor and Peter Lawford, the 1994 film Little Women starring Winona Ryder and the 2019 film Little Women featuring Saoirse Ronan.

Plot
Set in Concord, Massachusetts during and after the American Civil War, the film is a series of vignettes focusing on the struggles and adventures of the four March sisters and their mother, affectionately known as Marmee, while they await the return of their father, a colonel and a chaplain in the Union Army. Spirited tomboy Jo, who caters to the whims of their well-to-do Aunt March, dreams of becoming a famous author, and she writes plays for her sisters to perform for the local children. Amy is pretty but selfish, Meg works as a governess and sensitive Beth practices on her clavichord.

The girls meet Laurie, who has come to live with his grandfather, Mr. Laurence, the Marches' wealthy next-door neighbor. The Laurences invite them to a lavish party where Meg meets Laurie's tutor John Brooke. During the next several months, John courts Meg, Jo's first short story becomes published and Beth often takes advantage of Mr. Laurence's offer for her to practice on his piano.

Marmee learns that her husband is recuperating in a hospital in Washington, D.C. after an injury, so she travels there to care for him. During her absence, Beth contracts scarlet fever from a neighbor's baby. She recovers, but is in a weakened condition. The March parents return, and Meg marries John. Laurie confesses his love to Jo, who rejects him. When he snubs her in return, Jo moves to New York City to pursue her writing career, and she lives in a boarding house. There she meets Professor Bhaer, an impoverished German linguist. With his help and encouragement, Jo improves her writing, and she resolves her confused feelings about Laurie.

Beth is near to death, so Jo returns to Concord to be with her family. After Beth dies, a grieving Jo learns that Amy, who accompanied Aunt March to Europe, has fallen in love with Laurie and accepted his proposal. Upon the return of Laurie and Amy, who are now married, Jo is happy for them. Professor Bhaer arrives from New York City and brings Jo's manuscript for Little Women, which is soon to be published. He confesses his love to Jo and proposes. Jo accepts, welcoming him to the family.

Cast
 Katharine Hepburn as Josephine "Jo" March
 Joan Bennett as Amy March
 Frances Dee as Margaret "Meg" March 
 Jean Parker as Elizabeth "Beth" March
 Spring Byington as Marmee March
 Douglass Montgomery as Theodore "Laurie" Laurence
 Paul Lukas as Professor Bhaer
 Edna May Oliver as Aunt March
 Henry Stephenson as Mr. Laurence
 John Davis Lodge as Brooke
 Samuel S. Hinds as Mr. March
 Nydia Westman as Mamie
 Harry Beresford as Doctor Bangs
 Mabel Colcord as Hannah
 Marion Ballou as Mrs. Kirke
 Olin Howland as Mr. Davis (uncredited)

Production

Although David O. Selznick received no screen credit, he returned to RKO from MGM to supervise the production as the last film left in his contract with the studio.

The prime goal of director George Cukor was to emphasize the juxtaposition between sacrifice and family life in Little Women.

At Hepburn's request, costume designer Walter Plunkett created a dress for her character based on one worn by her maternal grandmother in a tintype photo. Plunkett needed to redesign several of Joan Bennett's costumes to conceal her advancing pregnancy, a condition that Bennett intentionally had not mentioned to Cukor when he cast her in the film. Plunkett designed all of the costumes very thoughtfully, purposely shuffling clothing items among the March sisters in different scenes to emphasize the family bond.

Louise Closser Hale was originally scheduled to portray Aunt March, but after her death on July 26, 1933, Edna May Oliver assumed the role.

Cukor impulsively decided on Bennett for the role of Amy March after meeting her at a party while she was slightly inebriated, making her the second billed actress in the cast.

The film was budgeted at $1 million, and 4,000 people worked on it during the year-long production schedule. Approximately 3,000 items, including costumes, furnishings and household appliances, were authenticated by researchers. Hobe Erwin, a former artist and interior decorator, was hired to oversee the set decoration, and he modeled the interior of the March home after Orchard House, Louisa May Alcott's Massachusetts home. Exteriors were filmed at Lancaster's Lake in Sunland, Providencia Ranch in the Hollywood Hills and the Warner Bros. Ranch in Pasadena. Original prints of the film employed the use of hand-coloring for fireplaces and candles.

Release
The film opened on November 16, 1933 at Radio City Music Hall, and despite fact that it was the coldest November 16 in the past 50 years, the film broke opening-day records with 23,073 people attending. It earned more than $100,000 during its first week of release. A record 451,801 people attended the three-week run at Radio City Music Hall before the film was moved to RKO's Center Theatre, where a further 250,000 people attended over the course of four weeks.

RKO may have benefited from the fact that Depression-era audiences were especially receptive of the film's evocation of life in a simpler and more innocent world. In addition, as the film business had come under fire in 1932 and 1933 for violent and sexual themes, many valued the film's conservative nature.

During its initial release, Little Women earned total theater rentals of $2,000,000, with $1,397,000 from the U.S. and Canada and $663,000 from other countries. A 1938 rerelease earned an additional $70,000 in total rentals, resulting in an overall profit of $849,000. It was among the most popular films at the American box office in 1933.

Home media
The film was released on DVD for Region 1 markets (U.S., Canada and American territories) on November 6, 2001 by Warner Home Video.

Reception

Critical reception

The film was overwhelmingly praised by critics upon its release. Mordaunt Hall of The New York Times wrote "The easy-going fashion in which George Cukor, the director, has set forth the beguiling incidents in pictorial form is so welcome after the stereotyped tales with stuffed shirts. It matters not that this chronicle is without a hero, or even a villain, for the absence of such worthies, usually extravagantly drawn, causes one to be quite contented to dwell for the moment with human hearts of the old-fashioned days. The film begins in a gentle fashion and slips away smoothly without any forced attempt to help the finish to linger in the minds of the audience."

Variety called it "a superbly human document, sombre in tone, stately and slow in movement, but always eloquent in its interpretations." John Mosher of The New Yorker declared it "an amazing triumph", and "a picture more intense, wrought with more feeling, than any other we are likely to see for a long time to come."

The New York World-Telegram credited the film "a stunningly clever job of recapturing on the screen all the simplicity and charm of its author", and wrote that Hepburn gave "an unforgettably brilliant performance and that once and for all she definitely proves how unlimited and effortless an actress she really is."

The New York American wrote "It is possible that with the passage of months the memory of Katharine Hepburn's portrayal of the sensitive, fiery Jo will be dimmed a bit, or somewhat superseded by later displays of histrionic genius. But at the moment, and for days, weeks, months to come, Miss Hepburn's characterization will stand alone on a pedestal of flaming brilliance."

TV Guide rated the film four stars, calling it "unabashedly sentimental" and "an example of Hollywood's best filmmaking." It added "The sets, costumes, lighting, and direction by George Cukor all contribute greatly to this magnificent film, but the performances, especially Hepburn's, are what make the simple story so moving. There are laughs and tears aplenty in this movie, which presents a slice of American history in a way that children will find palatable. Released during the depths of the Depression, Little Women buoyed Americans' spirits. It still does."

Little Women was voted one of the ten best pictures of 1934 by Film Daily'''s annual poll of critics.

Accolades

Historical contextLittle Women by Louisa May Alcott takes place in the midst of the Civil War (during the 1860s). By the time the 1933 film was made the United States was in the midst of Great Depression and would be fighting in World War II in the near future. References that were once meant to be about the Civil War became all too relatable for audiences. Especially at the beginning of the film, the constant emphasis on food, frugality, conservation, activism, social reform, and want for family and morality are just a short list of the ideals that transferred directly from the Civil War era to the mindsets of Americans in the Great Depression. Cukor's focus on hardship and relief partnered with intense familial commitment creates a nostalgic and sentimental picture of joyfulness, moral improvement, and social progression. The 1933 film became a trademark of “an activist spirit grounded in unbreakable ties to family and community” as the March girls represent the hope and determination that was prominent during both the Civil War and the Great Depression.

In popular culture
The music played during the dance scene was reused in the 1994 Nintendo video game Hotel Mario.

Footnotes

References
 Koszarski, Richard. 1976. Hollywood Directors: 1914-1940''. Oxford University Press. Library of Congress Catalog Number: 76-9262.

External links

 
 
 
 
 

1933 films
1933 romantic drama films
American Civil War films
American romantic drama films
American black-and-white films
1930s English-language films
Films scored by Max Steiner
Films about sisters
Films about writers
Films directed by George Cukor
Films set in Massachusetts
Films set in New York City
Films set in the 1860s
Films whose writer won the Best Adapted Screenplay Academy Award
RKO Pictures films
Little Women films
1930s children's films
Photoplay Awards film of the year winners
1930s American films